Yves Colin de Verdière is a French mathematician.

Life
He studied at the École Normale Supérieure in Paris in the late 1960s, obtained his Ph.D. in 1973, and then spent the bulk of his working life as faculty  at Joseph Fourier University in Grenoble. He retired in December 2005.

Work
Colin de Verdière is known for work in spectral theory, in particular on the semiclassical limit of quantum mechanics (including quantum chaos); in graph theory where he introduced a new graph invariant, the Colin de Verdière graph invariant; and on a variety of other subjects within Riemannian geometry and number theory.

Honors and awards
His contributions have been recognized by several awards: senior member of the Institut Universitaire de France from 1991 to 2001; Prize Ampère of the French Academy of Sciences in 1999; Fellow of the American Academy of Arts and Sciences in 2004; Émile Picard Medal of the French Academy of Sciences in 2018. He was an invited speaker at the International Congress of Mathematicians, held in Berkeley, California in 1986.

External links

 
 

Living people
Year of birth missing (living people)
20th-century French mathematicians
21st-century French mathematicians
École Normale Supérieure alumni
Academic staff of Grenoble Alpes University
Fellows of the American Academy of Arts and Sciences